78 Aquarii (abbreviated 78 Aqr) is a star in the constellation of Aquarius. 78 Aquarii is its Flamsteed designation. Based on stellar parallax measurements made by Gaia, it is located about 600 light-years (180 parsecs) from the Sun.

78 Aquarii has a spectral type of K2III, indicating a giant star with a reddish color. Its apparent magnitude is 6.18, indicating it is not visible to the sky for all but the best viewing conditions. At its surface, its temperature is estimated to be roughly 4,400 K. It has no known exoplanets.

References

Aquarius (constellation)
K-type giants
Aquarii, 078
8710
113127
216637
Durchmusterung objects